Alexander Semyonovich Belyakov (born 20 May 1945) is a Russian politician who served as Governor of Leningrad Oblast in 1991–1996 and member of the State Duma of the Russian Federation in 1999–2005.

Biography
Alexander Belyakov was born in Sortavala, Karelo-Finnish SSR in 1945.

He was elected governor of Leningrad Oblast in 1991 and joined the pro-Boris Yeltsin Our Home is Russia political party in 1995. He was defeated by an independent, Communist Party of the Russian Federation-backed candidate, Vadim Gustov in the election in 1996.

Belyakov served as president of the SBS Agro Bank in 1997–1998 before being elected to the State Duma of the Russian Federation in 1999 and serving as chairman of its national resources committee. He was re-elected as a United Russia candidate in 2003.

Belyakov is currently president of the Russian Association of Paper & Pulp Organizations and Enterprises (RAO BUMPROM).

Honours and awards
Order "For Merit to the Fatherland", 4th class
Order of Honour (26 June 1995) - for services to the state, achievements in work, a great contribution to strengthening friendship and cooperation among peoples and selfless actions in rescuing the dying

References

1945 births
Living people
People from Sortavala
Governors of Leningrad Oblast
Recipients of the Order of Honour (Russia)
Recipients of the Order "For Merit to the Fatherland", 4th class
Our Home – Russia politicians
United Russia politicians
21st-century Russian politicians
Members of the Federation Council of Russia (1994–1996)
Members of the Federation Council of Russia (1996–2000)
Third convocation members of the State Duma (Russian Federation)
Fourth convocation members of the State Duma (Russian Federation)